John Rutherford (1892 – 1930) was an English professional footballer. He played for Brighton & Hove Albion, Bristol Rovers and Gillingham between 1920 and 1927.

References

1892 births
1930 deaths
English footballers
Gillingham F.C. players
Tottenham Hotspur F.C. players
Luton Town F.C. players
Brighton & Hove Albion F.C. players
Cardiff City F.C. players
Bristol Rovers F.C. players
York City F.C. players
English Football League players
Midland Football League players
Association footballers not categorized by position